The DFG / LFA Freiburg is a DFG/LFA, a public French-German secondary school in Freiburg im Breisgau, Germany. It offers free education from grades 5 through 12.

For the final three years, students choose between literary, social, and natural science branches (L, ES and S) as is usual in French .

In 2017, on the occasion of the Treaty of Rome's 60th anniversary, the school's student representatives published a pro-European opinion piece saying "don't mess with the European Union".

Amenities 
The campus consists of an old building  with an annex and a gym, a new building, a sports field, and a pavilion.:53 The old building was designed by Konrad Kuhn:68 and built in 1976. It stands on the former site of the municipal plant nursery, which moved to the Mundenhof in the west of Freiburg in the early 1970s.

The roofs of the old and new building are equipped with photovoltaic solar panels with a combined nominal power of 55 kWp. The panels were erected by students and teachers, and belong to a registered association (e.V.) incorporated in 2002. The association also installed a small wind turbine on the new building.

The school offers rooms in its boarding school in Günterstal, which had 64 residents in 2017.:47 Around 100 students live across the French border in Alsace and attend school using a bus organised by parents.

Notable alums 
Franziska Brantner, former Member of the European Parliament and member of the German Bundestag since 2013
Isabelle Joschke, sailor
David Afkham

See also
Deutsch-Französisches Gymnasium (about the school form)
German international schools in France:
DFG / LFA Buc
DFG / LFA Strasbourg
Internationale Deutsche Schule Paris
Deutsche Schule Toulouse

References

External links

 DFG / LFA Freiburg

French international schools in Germany
Schools in Freiburg im Breisgau
France–Germany relations
1972 establishments in Germany
Educational institutions established in 1972